Gaius Sempronius Gracchus ( – 121 BC) was a reformist Roman politician in the 2nd century BC. He is most famous for his tribunate for the years 123 and 122 BC, in which he proposed a wide set of laws, including laws to establish colonies outside of Italy, engage in further land reform, reform the judicial system, and create a subsidised grain supply for Rome.

The year after his tribunate, his political enemies used political unrest – which he and his political allies had caused – as an excuse to declare martial law and march on his supporters, leading to his death. After his death, his political allies were purged in a series of trials, but most of his legislation was undisturbed.

His brother was the reformer Tiberius Sempronius Gracchus. Both, known together as the Gracchi brothers, were the sons of the Gracchus who was consul in 177 and 163 BC.

Background 

Gaius Gracchus was born into a very well-connected political family. His father, Tiberius Sempronius Gracchus, was a very successful politician of the 2nd century BC: he served in the consulships for 177 and 163 BC, and was elected censor in 169. He also had celebrated two triumphs during the 170s, one for the victorious establishment of a twenty-year-long peace in Spain.

His mother was Cornelia, daughter of Scipio Africanus, a noble woman who was a major influence on the Gracchi. As a widow, after the elder Gracchus' death, she refused the marriage proposal of Ptolemy VIII, the king of Egypt, preferring to devote her life to the upbringing of her sons.

Tiberius Gracchus, Gaius' elder brother, had through his marriage aligned the family with the Claudii Pulchri, despite his maternal connections to the Cornelii Scipiones, as the two families had a historic rivalry. It can be supposed, however, that both the Gracchi brothers would have come into contact with powerful members both families.

Early political career 

Gaius Gracchus served in the Roman army under Scipio Aemilianus during the campaign against Numantia starting in 133 BC. He may have held the military tribunate during his service there. During his elder brother Tiberius' tribunate, he started his political career with election as a commissioner in the Gracchan land commission to distribute public land to poor families.

In 126 BC, he supported Marcus Fulvius Flaccus' political programme. While in Rome, he opposed a proposed tribunician law to prohibit non-citizens from settling in Roman towns and evict those who had done so. He then left as quaestor to the Roman province of Sardinia to fight the rebels there under Lucius Aurelius Orestes. 

During a harsh winter, Gracchus' was successful in procuring supplies from the Sardinians for the hard-pressed Roman troops. Orestes' command in Sardinia was prorogued for a second time, extending it to the point where Gaius wanted to leave to continue his career. Plutarch reports, probably based on Gracchus' own statements, that the reason for his commander's prorogation was because the senate wanted to keep him away from Rome, an allegation which is "patently absurd": the reason for the prorogation was almost certainly because Orestes' campaign was not complete and Orestes wanted to win his triumph.

Gracchus, regardless, quit Sardinia and returned to the city early, without the permission of his commander. After his return, he was also interrogated by the censors on why he had quit his post: in response, he pleaded that he had already served longer than most, that he had a right to return after one year, and that his good character and services were more than sufficient: in effect, he "pleaded his right to be released as justification for releasing himself". He was later accused of aiding in an Italian revolt at Fregellae that had occurred in 125 BC, but was successful in rebutting the charges; well known to the people, he stood for election as tribune and won.

Tribunate 

Gaius was elected as one of the tribunes of the plebs for 123 BC. He embarked on an aggressive legislative programme immediately, aiming very broadly to appeal to many interest groups along with a "rousing style of public speaking that made him the greatest [Roman orator] between Cato the censor and Cicero".

Gaius also changed how speeches were delivered from the rostra. Formerly, when a speaker delivered a speech in the forum, he turned his face to the right in the direction of the curia, the senate house, and the Comitium. Instead, Gaius would turn his face to the left, toward the direction of the Forum proper, effectively turning his back on the Senate.

First tribunate (123 BC) 

In his first year, as one of the tribunes for 123 BC, he proposed two initial measures: (1) a bill to prohibit any magistrate deposed by the people from standing again for office and (2) a law to reaffirm appeal to the people in capital cases which made transgressing magistrates liable for prosecution. The first bill was withdrawn at the request of his mother, Cornelia. Courts with capital punishment, not set up by the people, were now declared illegal ex post facto which saw the former consul for 132 BC, Publius Popillius Laenas, driven into exile.

He then proposed a grain law establishing a maximum price of six and a third asses for a modius of grain and re-enacted Tiberius' law on agricultural land redistribution. The subsidised grain would be bought when prices were low and stored in public granaries; the price itself was "probably a little below the price fetched by wheat immediately after the harvest". 

His elder brother's lex agraria had been successful: Gracchan boundary stones are found all over southern Italy, and suggest distribution some 1.3 million jugera (or 3 268 square kilometres) of land, accommodating somewhere between 70 and 130 thousand settlers. The contents of Gaius' further land reform are less clear: "the sources are rather vague about the agrarian activities of Gaius". Mommsen asserted that he revitalised the commission by transferring to it jurisdiction over land disputes from the consuls, but there is no explicit evidence of this. The new law did clarify which land could be redistributed, however, and after his first year as tribune there are boundary stones (cippi) showing that he was successful in redistributing land around Apulia. He also probably carried laws authorising new Roman colonies at Scolacium and Tarentum. His novel policy of establishing colonies outside of Italy made him "apparently the first to realise that the amount of land in Italy was insufficient to provide for all inhabitants of the peninsula".

The legislative programme also included a law, the lex militaris, to provide soldiers' clothing from the public treasury and prohibit conscription of men below the age of seventeen. While the conscription age limit had already been previous law, "it is commonly said that Gracchus [included]  this provision because [of] recent cases of persons below the minimum age being conscripted" but this is rejected as implausible. The law more likely simply restated the conditions of military service.

This was followed by a law to establish farming tithes in Asia, "which in effect handed [the people of the province] over to the large corporations of tax farmers", to shore up support among the equestrians. A further bill to incorporate either 300 or 600 equestrians into the senate was probably ineffectual.

He also proposed a law, the lex Sempronia de provinciis consularibus, for the senate to assign consular provinces before elections to the consulship. He also made such senatorial assignments immune from tribunician veto; Ernst Badian notes "this law shows how far he was from being a 'democrat'". The purpose of the lex de provinciis consularibus was to prevent sitting consuls from using their positions in the electoral comitia to influence provincial assignments improperly. In general, his reforms were addressing major issues in administration. At the same time, he was a "proud aristocrat" and left the senate in charge of directing policy and execution thereof by magistrates, under more stringent checks by the people and anti-corruption laws. The ultimate result of his laws, however, was to set up the equestrian publicani as "a new exploiting class, not restrained by a tradition of service or accountability at law"; these consequences did not become clear for a generation. Further legislation included some laws establishing new customs duties. 

At the elections of 123 BC, according to Plutarch, Gaius did not stand for election at all; rather, the tribes elected him spontaneously, with the election ratified by the presiding magistrate. Re-election might not have suited his plans – Gaius was needed in Africa to supervise construction of a colony at Carthage – but he was returned to the tribunate with friends: Marcus Fulvius Flaccus would be one of this tribunician colleagues and Gaius Fannius would be consul.

Second tribunate (122 BC) 

Either after re-election to a second tribunate or during the second tribunate itself, he passed a law to transfer the jury pool on corruption courts (quaestio de repetundis) to the equestrians. This law, however, "merely reallocated influence from one section of the elite to another" and "did not 'democratise' [the repetundae court] merely hand[ing] control to non-senatorial members of the elite". This law also substantially changed Roman criminal procedure by allowing the allies to prosecute (both directly and through an intermediary) ex-magistrates for corruption.

The difficulty of finding enough land in Italy for resettlement – as taking land from the Italian allies was politically impossible as it would have "wrought serious damage to their interests" – led Gaius and his allies to pursue both Italian and foreign colonisation programmes. An ally of Gaius Gracchus', Gaius Rubrius, as part of the Gracchan programme, successfully carried a law to establish a colony at Carthage. One of the other tribunes in this year, Marcus Livius Drusus, countered Gaius and Rubrius' programme by proposing twelve colonies of three thousand needy families each, with allotments of land free from rent. Drusus' proposals passed also, but "came to nothing"; regardless, the passage led to establishment of a series of three-man boards to manage the various colonisation programmes. Supposedly, these proposals from Livius Drusus were brought at the prompting of the senate, which sought to find someone else to rival Gracchus' popularity.

Gaius also proposed, in probably two citizenship bills, giving citizenship to the Latins and Latin rights to Italian allies. Gaius' rationale may have been related to the land reform measures:

The first bill, to give citizenship to the Latins, was vetoed by Drusus and the latter bill on Latin rights for the Italians may have also given them full citizenship rights but, although Fannius was an ally of Gracchus', he opposed the second bill. Drusus countered Gaius' Italian citizenship bill with a much less extensive bill to exempt them from scourging, which passed. Fannius, for his part, was able to mobilise opposition to extending citizenship by convincing the people that extending citizenship would require them to share their privileges. A fragment of Fannius' speech survives:

The issue persisted through the end of the year to the consular elections, when Fannius promulgated an edict expelling Italians from Rome, which was opposed by an edict of Gaius' which allegedly promised tribunician protection for any Italians who remained (but was, in the event unfulfilled).

He also proposed a bill to have the centuries (the Roman voting blocs) vote in a random order rather than in traditional order where the richest centuries voted first. Changing the order to random would not have changed the overweighting of the rich in the Roman comitia, but would have ensured "the chances of those who drew their support from the poorer citizens would not be prejudiced". There is, however, no evidence that this bill passed.

During his second tribunate, he left the city – perhaps sanctioned by the senate – to supervise the foundation of the colony at Carthage, which supposedly was plagued with bad omens. The citizenship bills' failure, however, revealed his waning popularity, and he was defeated when standing for re-election to a third consecutive tribunate.

Outbreak of violence 

In the new year, some of Gaius' and his allies' legislative programme came under attack. One of the tribunes for 121 BC, Minucius Rufus, wished to repeal the lex Rubria authorising the construction of the colony at Carthage. When an attendant jeered at Gracchus and his entourage during a sacrifice and was stabbed to death with styluses, the consul Lucius Opimius summoned a meeting of the senate, which Gracchus and his ally – Marcus Fulvius Flaccus – did not attend.

At the senate meeting, the senate moved the senatus consultum ultimum and urged Opimius to attack Gracchus and his allies. In response, Gracchus and Flaccus armed their followers and seized the temple of Diana on the Aventine hill. Opimius called out the militia, along with some Cretan mercenary archers, and ordered the two to submit themselves to the judgement of the senate. Then, he marched into the Aventine with his forces, promising the weight of Gaius' head in gold. Flaccus and his sons were killed, Gracchus was either killed or committed suicide after fleeing across the river Tiber.

Aftermath 

In the aftermath of Gaius' death, a judicial inquiry was established to try Gracchan supporters. Apparently, "many were executed after a brief investigation without the formalities of trial", with an extensive purge reportedly of thousands. Plutarch also reports that Gaius, Flaccus, and others' estates were confiscated, along with the dowry of his widow, Licinia; Plutarch, however, is likely wrong in this matter; it is more likely that only their houses were demolished, with their estates passing thence to their heirs.

Opimius was not entirely unreflective of his actions. Following the strife,

Many in Rome, however, did not share his religious pretensions: according to Plutarch, one night an inscription was carved that read "A work of mad discord produces a temple of Concord." The events of this year also spilled into the next year. When Opimius gave up his consulship, he was prosecuted by Publius Decius – one of the plebeian tribunes for 120 BC – on charges of violating the lex Sempronia which Gaius had passed that prohibited the execution of Roman citizens without appeal to the people. Opimius, however, was able to successfully defend himself by pointing to the senatus consultum ultimum and claiming that his opponents did not deserve treatment akin to that of Roman citizens; his successful defence enabled such senatorial decrees to be used as "carte blanche for the most brutal reprisals". The use of force itself, furthermore, set a precedent "suggest[ing] violence as the logical and more effective alternative to political engagement, negotiation, and compromise".

Gaius' legislation, however, mostly survived, revealing again that "it was no longer a specific issue that mattered so much as the urgent necessity to triumph over rivals". While the African colonies law was repealed, a new agrarian law continued distribution of territories around Carthage to the poor, and colonial schemes in Italy survived with minor changes. The matter of citizenship for the Italians, however, was not reintroduced for some thirty years. As a whole, "the aristocracy's reaction resembled that of a general dealing with a mutiny, who accedes to most of the demands but executes the ringleaders to preserve discipline". Overseas colonial projects also did not end: just a few years later, a bill was carried in defiance of the senate establishing a colony at Narbonne.

Only in 111 BC, some ten years later, was the Gracchan land commission disestablished by another lex agraria (sometimes called the lex Thoria but attribution is disputed), not because of plutocratic influence, but because the job of distributing public lands was complete. All public land distributed or otherwise confirmed under the Gracchan land reform laws was confirmed and fully privatised. By this point, practically the only remaining ager publicus was common pastureland or land under long-term leases, land which could not be distributed.

Gaius Gracchus' subsidised grain law also survived past this death. It was repealed only in the last decade of the century, by a Marcus Octavius who was tribune some time between 122 and 104, but was quickly revived by Lucius Appuleius Saturninus.

See also 
 Gracchi brothers
 Tiberius Gracchus, his brother

References

Citations

Sources

External links
 
 

154 BC births
121 BC deaths
2nd-century BC Romans
Ancient Roman politicians who committed suicide
Characters in Book VI of the Aeneid
Populares
Reformers
Roman quaestors
Sempronii
Social reformers
Tribunes of the plebs